Vittorio (Vito) Lattanzio (31 October 1926 – 31 October 2010) was an Italian Christian Democrat politician and physician.

Biography 
Lattanzio was born on 31 October 1926 in Bari, Italy. He would get a degree in medicine and begin working as a physician before entering politics, where he would become a prominent member of the Christian Democrats; making a name for himself in the field of foreign policy.

Political career 
He would first take the national stage by becoming the undersecretary of defence in the Andreotti II Cabinet.

Lattanzio served as minister of defence (1976–1977) in the Andreotti III Cabinet. He would face harsh criticism for his role as minister of defence after convicted Nazi Herbert Kappler escaped from Italian custody in 1977 to find sanctuary in West Germany. He would ultimately resign from this position due to the scandal, but go on to take different cabinet level positions.

Following the kidnapping and death of fellow Apulia native Aldo Moro, Lattanzio effectively inherited the 'Apulian electoral fortune.' 

He would go on to serve the cabinets of Prime Ministers Andreotti (1976–1978, 1989–1992) and De Mita (1988–89) as minister of transport, then minister of civil protection, and lastly as minister of foreign trade. While serving as Minister of Civil protection he would be criticized for inefficient handling of the department during the 1990 Augusta Earthquake. Lattanzio would actively participate in increasing trade with China while Minister of Foreign Trade. He also served in the Chamber of Deputies of Italy in Legislature III, Legislature IV, Legislature V, Legislature VI, Legislature VII, Legislature VIII, Legislature IX and Legislature X.

Lattanzio would be placed under house arrest while being investigated on allegations of corruption and illicit party financing.

He died in his hometown of Bari on his 84th birthday, and was survived by his daughter.

Works 

 Wrote Italian Security Policy and the North Atlantic Alliance for the Nato Review.

References

External links
La fuga di Kappler - intervista a Vito Lattanzio di Enzo Cicchino, L'Archivio, 2000

1926 births
2010 deaths
People from Bari
Christian Democracy (Italy) politicians
Transport ministers of Italy
Italian Ministers of Defence
Christian Democracy (Italy) members of the Chamber of Deputies (Italy)
Deputies of Legislature III of Italy
Deputies of Legislature IV of Italy
Deputies of Legislature V of Italy
Deputies of Legislature VI of Italy
Deputies of Legislature VII of Italy
Deputies of Legislature VIII of Italy
Deputies of Legislature IX of Italy
Deputies of Legislature X of Italy
Politicians of Apulia